Hannoverscher Sportverein von 1896, commonly referred to as Hannover 96, Hannover or simply 96, is a German professional football club based in the city of Hanover, Lower Saxony. They played in the Bundesliga for a total of 30 years between 1964 and 2019 and currently play in the 2. Bundesliga, the second tier in the German football league system, having been relegated from the Bundesliga, Germany's first tier, after finishing 17th in the 2018–19 season.

Hannover 96 was founded in 1896. Hannover have won two German championships and one DFB-Pokal. Hannover's stadium is the HDI-Arena. Hannover 96 has a long-standing rivalry with Eintracht Braunschweig.

History

Foundation to WWII
The club was founded on 12 April 1896 as Hannoverscher Fußball-Club 1896, upon the suggestion of Ferdinand-Wilhelm Fricke, founder of the Deutscher FV 1878 Hannover. Their initial enthusiasm was for athletics and rugby; football did not become their primary interest until 1899. Most of the membership of Germania 1902 Hannover became part of 96 in 1902, while others of the club formed Hannoverscher Ballspielverein. In 1913, they merged with Ballverein 1898 Hannovera (formed in the 1905 merger of Fußballverein Hannovera, 1898 Hannover, and Hannoverscher BV) to become Hannoverscher Sportverein 1896. Hannoverscher FC's colours were black-white-green, but they played in blue, while BV played in red. The newly united team kept black-white-green as the club colours, but they chose to take to the field in red, giving the team the nickname Die Roten ("The Reds"). The team's third jersey is in the club's official colours. The club made regular appearances in the national playoffs through the early 1900s, but was unable to progress past Eintracht Braunschweig, planting the seeds of a rivalry that has survived to this day. HSV continued to field strong sides and make national level appearances on into the 1920s. During Nazi rule, German football was re-organized into 16 top-flight leagues in 1933 and Hannover became part of the Gauliga Niedersachsen. They appeared in the country's final rounds in 1935 and sent representatives to the national side the next year. They won their first national championship in 1938 in what was one of the biggest upsets in German football history when they beat Schalke 04, the most dominant side in the country in the era. The two sides played to a 3–3 draw before Hannover prevailed 4–3 in a tension-filled re-match. In 1942, the team moved to the newly formed Gauliga Braunschweig-Südhannover.

Post-War era

Like most other German organizations, the club was dissolved after World War II by occupying Allied authorities. A combined local side was assembled in August 1945 and the next month a mixed group of players from Hannover 96 and Arminia Hannover played their first post-war match against a British military team. HSV was later formally re-established as Hannoverscher SV on 11 November 1945 before re-adopting its traditional name on 27 April 1946. The club resumed league play in 1947 in the first division Oberliga Nord and was relegated, but quickly returned to the top-flight in 1949. Hannover 96's next appearance in a national final would not come until 1954 when they soundly defeated 1. FC Kaiserslautern 5–1. The beaten side included five of the same players who would go on later that year to win Germany's first World Cup in a surprise victory known as the Miracle of Bern. In 1963, the Bundesliga, Germany's new professional football league, began play with 16 of the nation's top teams. Hannover played in the Regionalliga Nord (II) that season, but earned promotion to the senior circuit in the following year. The club's advance to the Bundesliga in 1964 was well received as they set a league attendance record in their first year, averaging 46,000 spectators a game. 96 played at the upper level for a decade, until finally relegated to the 2nd Bundesliga Nord for the 1974–75 season. They bounced right back, but were again sent down, this time to spend 17 of the next 20 years in the second tier.

Reunification to present

The club suffered from financial problems in the late 1970s and again in the early 1990s. Then, in 1992, Hannover put together an impressive run that would lead them to the capture of their first DFB-Pokal and help to set their finances right. That run included victories over Bundesliga sides Borussia Dortmund, VfL Bochum, Karlsruher SC, Werder Bremen and Borussia Mönchengladbach, as they became the first lower division side to win the competition. Hero for the cupwinners was goalkeeper Jörg Sievers, who made two saves when the semi-final match went to penalties and then scored the winner in his own turn at the spot. In the cup final, he again made two saves when that match was also decided on penalties. The team's low point came with demotion to Regionalliga Nord (III) for two years in 1996–98: the fact that the fall from the second league came during their anniversary year unfortunately made them a laughingstock among fans of rival teams for years to come.

Hannover made a fresh start with a new team of hungry youngsters, many of whom went on play for the national team – notably Gerald Asamoah, Sebastian Kehl and Fabian Ernst – or impress in the Bundesliga. 96 returned to tier II play in 1998, and to the Bundesliga in 2002 on the strength of a record-setting 75-point season. Since their promotion, the club have consolidated in the top flight, achieving a string of mid-table finishes under the command of several managers. Coach Dieter Hecking was brought in just weeks into the 2006–07 season after a disastrous start under Peter Neururer, in which the club lost the first three matches by a combined 11 goals. The 2007–08 season showed some early promise with impressive pre-season wins over Rangers and Real Madrid. However, they earned mixed results in their opening six Bundesliga matches. The team then put together a three match winning run, capped by a 2–0 win at champions VfB Stuttgart, to surge into the top six. Following the winter break, Hannover slipped after putting forth some disappointing performances which they turned around to be defeated only two times in their last 11 matches of the season. This secured a points record of 49 for Die Roten in the Bundesliga, thus ending them in eighth place.

The 2008–09 season started undesirably for Hannover with losses. However, it looked to have been rectified with a 5–1 thrashing of Borussia Mönchengladbach, a shock 1–0 win over Bayern Munich at home, which had not occurred for 20 years, and a thrilling 3–0 victory over Hamburger SV. Hannover settled in the lower-mid-table until the winter break. The second half of the season consisted of inconsistent results, relying almost entirely on home form to keep Hannover in the top league. The club finally achieved an away win with a few games remaining which boosted them from trouble and stabilized them, leading to an 11th-place finish. The season was one of inconsistent form and long injuries to key players.

The 2009–10 season was launched with new optimism with a new kit being released which included traditional away and alternative kits. Hannover also signed a new technical director in Jörg Schmadtke, who brought a new perspective to the club. The new signings were Karim Haggui and Constant Djakpa from Bayer Leverkusen, Valdet Rama from FC Ingolstadt. The season started undesirably with a late 1–0 loss to Hertha BSC and a disappointing home draw to Mainz 05, after which coach Dieter Hecking resigned voluntarily. He was succeeded by former assistant Andreas Bergmann. As the season continued, once again Hannover had many key players injured, including the majority of attacking players and key defenders, as well as the shocking and tragic suicide of German international goalkeeper Robert Enke. Andreas Bergmann was removed as coach and replaced by Mirko Slomka shortly after the winter break. Arouna Koné and Elson were signed to boost the squad. Hannover 96 spent the majority of the year in the relegation zone, and with a few wins in the last games of the season, Hannover had to win and hope results went their way for them. Hannover won 3–0, with Arnold Bruggink, Mike Hanke and Sérgio Pinto all scoring to keep them in the Bundesliga.

In the 2010–11 season, Hannover surprised everybody by finishing in a record-high fourth place, qualifying for Europe for the first time in 19 years. In 2011–12, the team opened with a 2–1 win over 1899 Hoffenheim, followed by a 2–1 away win against 1. FC Nürnberg. In the play-offs to the Europa League, Hannover won against Sevilla 3–2 on aggregate to reach the group stage. Shortly before the end of the 2011–12 season, Hannover Technical Director Jörg Schmadtke resigned due to family issues. It had been speculated that Schmadtke would join 1. FC Köln, but according to Bild, Schmadtke agreed with President Martin Kind on a return to Hannover after his break.

Hannover finished bottom of the Bundesliga in 2015/16 and was relegated to 2. Bundesliga. The club chose to keep the majority of their first-team squad together. However, after a good start to the 2016/17 season, a poor run of form prompted the club's board to sack manager Daniel Stendel, and appoint Andre Breitenreiter as their new manager. He led the team to seven wins in the final 11 games, helping the 96ers secure second place behind VfB Stuttgart and bounce back to the top flight at the first attempt.

The club suffered adverse publicity when a large contingent of ultras travelled to England for a 2017/18 pre-season game against Burnley. They caused trouble in the town centre prior to the game. Once inside Turf Moor they responded to a brief altercation on the pitch after 40 minutes by charging the home fans, tearing out seats and using them as missiles. On police advice the game was abandoned at half time with Hannover 96 trailing 1–0.

Crest

Death of Robert Enke

On 10 November 2009, at the age of 32, Hannover's first-choice goalkeeper Robert Enke committed suicide when he stood in front of a regional express train at a level crossing in Eilvese, Neustadt am Rübenberge. Police confirmed a suicide note was discovered but would not publicise its details. His widow, Teresa, revealed that her husband had been suffering from depression for six years and was treated by a psychiatrist. After the death of his daughter Lara in 2006, he struggled to cope with the loss.

Many fans immediately flocked to Hannover 96's AWD-Arena home to lay flowers and light candles and sign the book of condolences upon news breaking. His former club Barcelona held a minute's silence before their game that night, and several international matches the following weekend paid the same tribute. As a mark of respect, the German national team cancelled their friendly match against Chile which had been scheduled for 14 November. A minute's silence was also held at all Bundesliga games on 21 and 22 November 2009, as well as at Benfica's game in the Taça de Portugal, a former club of Enke. Germany also cancelled a planned training session and all interviews after his death. Oliver Bierhoff, the national team's general manager, said, "We are all shocked. We are lost for words."

On 15 November 2009, nearly 40,000 attendees filled the AWD-Arena for his memorial service. Enke's coffin, covered in white roses, was carried by six of his Hannover 96 teammates. He was then buried in Neustadt, outside the city of Hanover, next to his daughter's grave. As a further mark of respect for their former teammate, Hannover 96 players displayed the number one in a circle on the breast of their jerseys, as approved by the German Football Association (DFL), as a subtle tribute for the rest of the 2009–10 season.

Stadium
Hannover 96 plays in the HDI-Arena, built in 1954 as the "Niedersachsenstadion", which now has a capacity of 49,000 spectators. Before the year 2013 the arena was called "AWD-Arena". But after changing the sponsor the stadium name was changed to "HDI-Arena". During the 2006 World Cup, the stadium was the site of four first round matches and one Round of 16 match. The stadium had also served as a site for matches in the 1974 World Cup and UEFA Euro 1988.

European Cups history

Honours
The club's honours:
 German Championship
 Champions: 1938, 1954
 DFB-Pokal
 Winners: 1991–92
 2. Bundesliga
 Champions: 1986–87, 2001–02
 2. Bundesliga Nord
 Champions: 1975

Regional
 Südkreisliga
 Champions: 1921, 1927, 1928, 1930
 Gauliga Niedersachsen
 Champions: 1935, 1938
 Oberliga Nord
 Champions: 1954
 Regionalliga Nord (Tier 3)
 Champions: 1997, 1998
 Lower Saxony Cup (Tiers 3–5)
 Winners: 1982,1998, 1999

Youth
 German Under 17 Championship
 Runners-up: 1994, 1995
 Under 19 Bundesliga North/Northeast
 Champions: 2004

Records
Miscellaneous Records

Players

Current squad

Out on loan

Coach history

 Robert Fuchs (1 July 1931 – 30 June 1946)
 Fritz Pölsterl (October 1946–47)
 Otto Höxtermann (August 1947 – September 1947)
 Robert Fuchs (1 July 1947 – 30 June 1950)
 Christian Bieritz (int.) (December 1950)
 Paul Slopianka-Hoppe (January 1951–51)
 Emil Izsó (1951–52)
 Helmut Kronsbein (1 July 1952 – 30 June 1957)
 Kuno Klötzer (1957–58)
 Fritz Silken (1958–59)
 Günter Grothkopp (1959 – Dec 61)
 Hannes Kirk (31 December 1961 – 31 March 1962)
 Heinz Lucas (1 July 1962 – 30 June 1963)
 Helmut Kronsbein (1 July 1963 – 29 April 1966)
 Hannes Kirk (int.) (29 April 1966 – 29 May 1966)
 Horst Buhtz (1 July 1966 – 12 August 1968)
 Karl-Hein Mühlhausen (int.) (13 February 1968 – 30 June 1968)
 Zlatko Čajkovski (1 July 1968 – 8 December 1969)
 Rolf Paetz (int.) (December 1969)
 Hans Pilz (2 January 1970 – 30 June 1970)
 Helmuth Johannsen (1 July 1970 – 13 November 1971)
 Hans Hipp (18 November 1971 – 1 March 1973)
 Hannes Baldauf (5 March 1973 – 12 March 1974)
 Helmut Kronsbein (13 March 1974 – 14 January 1976)
 Hannes Baldauf (15 January 1976 – 13 December 1976)
 Helmut Kronsbein (1 January 1977 – 30 June 1978)
 Anton Burghardt (1 July 1978 – 30 June 1979)
 Diethelm Ferner (1 July 1979 – 14 December 1982)
 Gerd Bohnsack (10 December 1982 – 24 October 1983)
 Werner Biskup (25 October 1983 – 21 November 1985)
 Jürgen Rynio (int.) (22 November 1985 – 12 January 1986)
 Jörg Berger (13 January 1986 – 17 March 1986)
 Helmut Kalthoff (18 March 1986 – 30 June 1986)
 Jürgen Wähling (1 July 1986 – 19 September 1988)
 Hans Siemensmeyer (19 September 1988 – 21 March 1989)
 Reinhard Saftig (22 March 1989 – 30 June 1989)
 Slobodan Čendić (1 July 1989 – 31 August 1989)
 Michael Krüger (13 September 1989 – 30 September 1990)
 Hans-Dieter Schmidt (int.) (1990)
 Michael Lorkowski (17 October 1990 – 30 June 1992)
 E. Vogel &  H. Baldauf (1 July 1992 – 8 November 1993)
 Rolf Schafstall (9 November 1993 – 30 October 1994)
 Stefan Mertesacker (int.) (31 October 1994 – 6 November 1994)
 Peter Neururer (7 November 1994 – 30 May 1995)
 Miloš Đelmaš (int.) (31 May 1995 – 18 June 1995)
 Egon Coordes (1 July 1995 – 25 March 1996)
 Jürgen Stoffregen (26 March 1996 – 30 June 1996)
 Reinhold Fanz (1 July 1996 – 21 December 1998)
 Franz Gerber (1 January 1999 – 30 June 1999)
 Branko Ivanković (1 July 1999 – 20 February 2000)
 Horst Ehrmantraut (21 February 2000 – 23 April 2001)
 Stanislav Levý (int.) (24 April 2001 – 30 June 2001)
 R. Rangnick &  M. Slomka (1 July 2001 – 7 March 2004)
 E. Lienen &  M. Frontzeck (9 March 2004 – 9 November 2005)
 Peter Neururer (9 November 2005 – 30 August 2006)
 Michael Schjønberg (int.) (1 September 2006 – 7 September 2006)
 Dieter Hecking (8 September 2006 – 19 August 2009)
 Andreas Bergmann (20 August 2009 – 19 January 2010)
 Mirko Slomka (19 January 2010 – 27 December 2013)
  Tayfun Korkut (31 December 2013 – 20 April 2015)
 Michael Frontzeck (20 April 2015 – 21 December 2015)
 Thomas Schaaf (4 January 2016 – 3 April 2016)
 Daniel Stendel (3 April 2016 – 20 March 2017)
 André Breitenreiter (20 March 2017 – 27 January 2019)
 Thomas Doll (27 January 2019 – 30 June 2019)
 Mirko Slomka (1 July 2019 – 3 November 2019)
 Asif Šarić (int.) (4 November 2019 – 14 November 2019)
 Kenan Koçak (14 November 2019 – 30 June 2021)
 Jan Zimmermann (1 July 2021 – 29 November 2021)
 Christoph Dabrowski (1 December 2021 – 30 June 2022)
 Stefan Leitl (1 July 2022 – )

Hannover 96 Amateure (II)

Hannover fields a successful amateur side that has three German amateur championships to its credit (1960, 1964, 1965) as well as losing appearances in the 1966 and 1967 finals. The second team has also taken part in the German Cup tournament and currently plays in the Regionalliga Nord (IV).

Honours
The team's honours:
 Amateurliga Niedersachsen-West
 Champions: 1960
 Amateurliga Niedersachsen-Ost
 Champions: 1964
 Amateurliga Niedersachsen
 Champions: 1965, 1966, 1967
 German amateur championship
 Champions: 1960, 1964, 1965
 Lower Saxony Cup
 Winners: 1982

See also
List of Hannover 96 seasons

References

External links

 
AWD Arena 

 
Football clubs in Germany
Football clubs in Lower Saxony
Association football clubs established in 1896
Multi-sport clubs in Germany
1896 establishments in Germany
Sport in Hanover
Bundesliga clubs
2. Bundesliga clubs